Martin Behrmann (16 July 1930 – 5 January 2014) was a German choirmaster and university teacher.

Life 
Born in Dessau, Behrmann was a grammar school pupil at the Katharineum in Lübeck and passed the Abitur at the Johanneum in Hamburg. He studied church music at the Musikhochschule Freiburg and pipe organ with Walter Kraft. He passed the A-examination at the Musikhochschule Lübeck.

From 1957 to 1966 he was cantor at the St. Andreas Church in Hamburg. He founded the Cappella Vocale Hamburg and was choir conducting teacher at the Hamburg University of Music until 1966. In 1966 he followed the call to teach choir conducting at the Spandauer Kirchenmusikschule (KMS), whose director he was from 1976 to 1998. He directed the Spandauer Kantorei for 29 years.

Behrmann was also involved with foreign church music associations such as the Sambalikhaan Foundation in the Philippines. There, together with other renowned church music teachers, he participated in corresponding workshops. The theological faculty of the Humboldt University in Berlin awarded him the title of professor. Until 2010, he taught at the Korean National University of Arts in Seoul, Korea.

Behrmann died in Löningen in Oldenburger Münsterland at age 83.

Publications 
 Chorleitung. Musikverlag Carus, Stuttgart, 1984,  SCM Hänssler,

Recordings 
 
 
 Ernst Pepping Passionsbericht des Matthäus (von Spandauer Kantorei und Capella Vocale Hamburg, Behrmann, Cad (Note 1), Audio-CD 2003. 
 César Franck Dramatische Evangelienmotetten (von Spandauer Kantorei Berlin, Cap.Vocale Hamburg, Behrmann, Hänssler, Audio-CD 1997. 
 25 Classical Christian Favorites. Cameo. 
 Johann Hermann Schein Israelsbrünnlein, Vox.

External links

References

Further reading 
 Yarbrough, Harold Leroy, "Martin Behrmann's Lehrbuch Fuer Chorleitung: a Translation. (Volumes One and Two)." (1985). LSU Historical Dissertations and Theses. 4083. https://digitalcommons.lsu.edu/gradschool_disstheses/4083

German choral conductors
20th-century German non-fiction writers
1930 births
2014 deaths
People from Dessau-Roßlau
Kirchenmusikdirektor